Deep Creek Township is a township in Clinton County, Iowa, USA.  As of the 2000 census, its population was 713.

Geography
According to the USGS, it contains three cemeteries: Saint Marys Catholic, Valley and Vernon Prairie.

Goose Lake is within this township. The streams of Bear Creek and Simmons Creek run through this township.

References
 USGS Geographic Names Information System (GNIS)

External links
 US-Counties.com
 City-Data.com

Townships in Clinton County, Iowa
Townships in Iowa